Morgentaler v R (also known as Morgentaler v The Queen) is a decision of the Supreme Court of Canada where physician Henry Morgentaler unsuccessfully challenged the prohibition of abortion in Canada under the Criminal Code. The Court found the abortion law was appropriately passed by Parliament under the laws of federalism. This was the first of three Supreme Court decisions on abortion that were brought by Morgentaler.

Background
Morgentaler was prosecuted, for openly providing abortions, by the provincial government of Quebec three times, but they failed to secure a conviction at a jury trial:
 The first Quebec case was in 1973. Morgentaler used the defence of necessity, that abortions were necessary for his patients' life or health. The jury acquitted him. However, Quebec's provincial appeal court reversed the acquittal and replaced it with a conviction and a prison term.
 In 1975, a jury in Quebec again found Morgentaler not guilty. However, Morgentaler was already in prison. In 1975, under Prime Minister Pierre Trudeau, the law of Canada was changed so that courts could not replace a jury acquittal by a conviction (however, appeal courts can still overturn an acquittal and order a new trial). This is called the Morgentaler Amendment.
 After Morgentaler was released from prison, Quebec again brought a case against him. A jury acquitted him for the third time. In 1976, the Parti Québécois was elected and announced that it would not prosecute Morgentaler, so the repeated prosecutions came to an end.

Morgentaler challenged the law on two grounds. First, on the grounds that modern abortion techniques were no longer a threat to the woman's health so the dangers that the law was intending to protect no longer applied and consequently the law no longer had a valid criminal purpose required under the federal government's criminal law-making power under section 91(27) of the Constitution Act, 1867. Second, on the grounds that the provisions violated the Bill of Rights.

Reasons of the court
The Court, split 6 to 3, held that the abortion provisions were still valid as there was still a criminal law purpose in prohibiting abortion even without there being a danger to the woman. The general purpose of the law was to "protect the state interest and the foetus", which was sufficient to invoke the criminal law power under the Constitution.

The Court also rejected the challenge on the basis that it violated the Bill of Rights.

Aftermath
It would not be until 13 years later, after the introduction of the Charter, that Morgentaler successfully challenged the provisions in the decision of R. v. Morgentaler (1988).

In 1993, Morgentaler also successfully challenged a provincial attempt to regulate abortion in the decision of R. v. Morgentaler (1993).

See also
List of Supreme Court of Canada cases (Laskin Court)

References

External links
 Full text of Supreme Court decision from canlii.org  and lexum 

Canadian abortion case law
Canadian federalism case law
Supreme Court of Canada cases
1975 in Canadian case law